SKILSAW Power Tools (since 1924) is a manufacturer of cutting technology serving the professional construction market.

History 
SKILSAW Power Tools was founded in 1924 by Edmond Michel. With the invention of its flagship tool, the SKILSAW Model E, equipped with an 8-inch blade, It was the world’s first portable circular saw. This saw's invention also spurred the use of worm drive gearing, a dual-field motor, and die-cast aluminium motor housing. In 1937, its successor, the SKILSAW Model 77, became the benchmark of portable saws, along with the SKILSAW Model 87 circular saws, and continues to be used on jobsites across the United States.

During the post-war era, the company expanded and began producing bench top tools and tools for a do-it-yourself audience. The company name was changed from SKILSAW Inc. to SKIL Corporation in 1952. Then, in November 2014, SKIL rebranded, making SKILSAW the brand serving the professional construction market and SKIL the brand serving the consumer do-it-yourself market.

Since rebranding, SKILSAW introduced a variety of new professional-grade saws not only for wood cutting, but for cutting new materials used on jobsites. The initial product lineup following the rebrand featured pro grade Sidewinder circular saws, and the first 10-1/4-inch worm drive saw. The following year brought three new metal cutting saws, including the first 8-inch worm drive optimized for metal, a 12-inch dry cut saw and a 14-inch abrasive chop saw. In addition to metal cutting, SKILSAW also announced a saw for fiber cement in 2015  and the first worm drive saw for concrete in 2016. Both of these saws were developed to meet new OSHA guidelines that protect workers from respirable silica dust. The company also expanded beyond traditional circular saws with the first worm drive table saw in 2016 and two reciprocating saws in 2017.

Products
SKILSAW’s product lineup includes worm drive saws, SIDEWINDER-branded circular saws and benchtop saws for various materials including wood, metal, fiber cement and concrete. In 2017, SKILSAW expanded its product offering from circular to linear cutting with its first reciprocating saws since rebranding.

Ownership history 
In 1991, the Emerson Electric Company and Robert Bosch GmbH entered into a joint venture by combining their power tool subsidiaries. In 1992, the new venture came to fruition as S-B Power Tool Co. In 1996, after four years of the partnership, Robert Bosch GmbH took over complete ownership of Skil.

On August 23, 2016, Chervon (HK) Ltd., a global power tool manufacturer agreed to acquire the SKILSAW brand from Robert Bosch Tool Corporation, which gave them control over the SKIL businesses in both North America and the European market.

References

1924 establishments in Illinois
Power tool manufacturers
Companies based in Naperville, Illinois
Tool manufacturing companies of the United States